James C. Simpson Jr. (January 7, 1905 – February 29, 1960) was an American politician who served one term in the United States House of Representatives from 1933 to 1935, representing Illinois.

Early life and career
Simpson was born in Chicago, Illinois on January 7, 1905, the son of prominent businessman James Simpson. He attended St. Paul's School in Concord, New Hampshire from 1919 to 1922, Westminster School, Salisbury, Connecticut from 1922 to 1925, and was later a student at Harvard University. He served as director of Marshall Field & Co. from 1931 to 1960.

Tenure in Congress
At the age of 28, Simpson was elected as a Republican to the Seventy-third Congress (March 4, 1933 – January 3, 1935). He was defeated in the Republican primary by Ralph Church in 1934.

Later career
He was admitted to the Illinois bar in 1939. He was owner and operator of farms near Wadsworth, Illinois, and Rapidan, Culpeper County, Virginia. He entered the United States Marine Corps in 1943 and served thirty-six months, with twenty-four months in the Pacific area, and was discharged as a captain.  He was a civilian aide to Secretary of the Army Robert T. Stevens in 1953 and 1954.

He died at his farm near Wadsworth, Illinois, February 29, 1960. He was interred in Graceland Cemetery, Chicago.

References

1905 births
1960 deaths
Burials at Graceland Cemetery (Chicago)
Harvard University alumni
Military personnel from Illinois
United States Marine Corps officers
St. Paul's School (New Hampshire) alumni
Westminster School (Connecticut) alumni
Republican Party members of the United States House of Representatives from Illinois
20th-century American politicians
People from Wadsworth, Illinois